Krute Ulcinjske, or just Kruta, is a village in the municipality of Ulcinj, Montenegro.

Demographics
According to the 2011 census, its population was 196.

References

Populated places in Ulcinj Municipality
Albanian communities in Montenegro